C. P. Sadashivaiah (Chikkanayakanahalli Prabhanna Sadashivaiah) (9 January 1931 – 2 June 2007) was an Indian freedom fighter who later became an industrialist, philanthropist and inventor. He has to his credit several designs of agricultural equipments and implements, some of which he himself designed, while many he improved.

Awards and recognition
2014: Awarded the NRDC National award and WIPO Gold Medal for his latest invention, Tractor mounted Deep trencher.

References

1931 births
2007 deaths
Indian independence activists from Karnataka
Indian industrialists
20th-century Indian inventors
People from Tumkur
20th-century Indian philanthropists
World Intellectual Property Organization people